P&P Projects is an international company that first started as a one-man business in Asten, Netherlands making space models and that now specializes in projects for the leisure industry. The company has been constructing and decorating projects for several organisations such as theme parks, museums, visitor centres, family entertainment centres, zoos and swimming pools around the world. P&P Projects specializes in theming, scenery, props, inter-actives, exhibits, animatronics, specials, scale models, and high quality interiors.

The company has a premises of 2,250 square meters. The production workshop measures 2,000 square meters and the office 250 square meters.

Projects 
 Theme park projects
 Speed of Sound (roller coaster), Walibi Holland, Design-build of the latest attraction of Walibi Netherlands.
 F1 Nürburgring Ring°Werk, Germany. P&P Projects did the theming of the dark rides, a large theatre, race simulators, pit boxes and car replicas. 
 Europa-Park Iceland, Germany
 Madame Tussauds Berlin, Germany
 Banana Splash Bobbejaanland, Belgium 
 Flamingo Land, United Kingdom
 Legoland California, United States of America
 Walibi Sud-Ouest, France
 The Amsterdam Dungeon, the Netherlands
 Aquatopia Antwerp, Belgium
 Splashbattle Walibi World Biddinghuizen, the Netherlands
 Museums
 Roshen, Ukraine
 Glasgow Science Centre, Scotland
 Earth Explorer 2004 Oostende, Belgium
 Visitor Centre Volkswagen Autostadt, Germany
 Sea Life Centres, Blackpool United Kingdom, Spain, the Netherlands

P&P Project Development 

This company was founded in 2006 and specializes in design for the leisure industry and television, along with consultancy, project management, graphical design, and inter-actives.

 Projects P&P Development
 Odysseum, Cologne Germany
 Lotte World parade, South Korea

References

Further reading 
P&P Projects. Interpark 2009 (4), p. 44.
New projects at EAS 2009. P&P Projects. Funworld, november/december 2009, p. 111.
Ford, J. HollandRama: The Visitors Center Takes Off. Behind the Themes, 2001 (6), p. 37+68.
Change of Theme. Attractions Management, October/November 2002, p. 56-58. 
P&P picks up new European projects. Attractions Management 2003 (3), p. 15.

External links 
 IAAPA International Association of Amusement Parks and Attractions

Scenic design
Companies based in North Brabant
Animatronics companies